The Leech–Hauer House was a historic residence in Huntsville, Alabama.  It was built circa 1830 by professional carpenter William Leech.  It was built in a transitional style between Federal and Greek Revival.  The house was a two-story, L-shaped structure, with a front porch which was later enclosed.  John G. Hauer purchased the house in 1904, and it remained a family residence until it was sold to a flower shop in 1974.  It was purchased by physician (and later politician) Parker Griffith and his brother in 1977.  The house was listed on the Alabama Register of Landmarks and Heritage and National Register of Historic Places in 1978.  The house was subsequently demolished, and a modern medical office building was constructed on the site in 1988.

References

National Register of Historic Places in Huntsville, Alabama
Houses on the National Register of Historic Places in Alabama
Federal architecture in Alabama
Greek Revival houses in Alabama
Houses completed in 1830
Demolished buildings and structures in Alabama
Houses in Huntsville, Alabama
Properties on the Alabama Register of Landmarks and Heritage
1830 establishments in Alabama